Peterhof landing stage is a mooring for hydrofoil boats, of the type Meteor, in the Lower Gardens of Peterhof Palace. It is located in northern end Sea Channel and is in a C-shaped form. The exit from it is directed aside St. Petersburg.

The mooring and foot platform are located at the open coast of Gulf of Finland. From above the design is blocked by ferro-concrete plates tee bars on five plates in flight.

For all visitors entry to Lower Gardens requires the purchase of tickets, but for visitors arriving by hydrofoil it is included in cost of the ticket for a sea line.

References 

Landing stages of Russian coast in Gulf of Finland